"Danced in the Fire" is a song by New Zealand singer songwriter Sharon O'Neill. The song was released in February 1988 as the second single from her fifth studio album, Danced in the Fire (1987).

Background
O'Neill signed with CBS records in 1978 and between 1979 and 1983, released four top twenty albums in New Zealand. A number of disputes followed, leading to an almost 5-year break where O'Neill was not able to release music. O'Neill continued to write music however and in 1987 once the CBS contract had expired,O'Neill promptly signed a two-album deal with Polydor Records. "Danced in the Fire" was written during that 5-year hiatus.

In a 2014 interview with 'Stuff', O'Neill said "Danced in the Fire" is her personal favourite and still resonates deeply now. She says ""It is my personal favourite... a lot was going on in my personal life, it was something I had to just get out musically. You are baring your soul to a degree. It's a nice disguise to put it in that form rather than just bawl your eyes out, that doesn't get you anywhere." adding "I was really happy when I finished that song, you know. I thought, phew, I can breathe now."

In a 2016 interview with Herald NZ, O'Neill said it is the song she is more proud of writing. She added "That was such a momentous time in my life – meeting Alan, breaking up with my husband, all the shit we went through with the record company – it's all in that song. It spilled out of me so fast, I had to get it out – it was cathartic."

Track listing 
7" (Polydor – 887 326-7) 
Side A "Danced in the Fire" – 3:29
Side B "Thirst for Love" – 3:50

12"/CD Maxi (Polydor – 887 326-1)
Side A1 "Danced in the Fire" (12" Mix) – 5:14
Side A2 "Thirst for Love" – 3:50
Side B1 "Danced in the Fire" (7" Version) – 3:29
Side Bs "Danced in the Fire" (Acapella Mix) – 3:42

Charts

Credits
 Alan Manfield – DX7, Hammond, Guitar
 Michael Hegarty – Bass
 Tommy Emmanuel – Guitar
 Jon Farriss – Drums
 Maggie McKinney, Mark Williams – Backing vocals

References 

1987 songs
1988 singles
Sharon O'Neill songs
Songs written by Sharon O'Neill
Polydor Records singles